The European zone of qualification for the 2010 FIFA World Cup saw 53 teams competing for 13 places at the finals in South Africa. The qualification process started on 20 August 2008, nearly two months after the end of UEFA Euro 2008, and ended on 18 November 2009. The qualification process saw the first competitive matches of Montenegro.

Denmark, England, Germany, Italy, Netherlands, Serbia, Slovakia, Spain, and Switzerland qualified in the first round by winning their groups. France, Greece, Portugal, and Slovenia qualified via the second round play-offs.

Format
Teams were drawn into eight groups of six teams and one group of five teams. The nine group winners qualified directly, while the best eight second-placed teams contested home and away play off matches for the remaining four places. In determining the best eight second placed teams, the results against teams finishing last in the six team groups were not counted for consistency between the five and six team groups.

Seeding
After initially proposing to use a similar system to recent World Cup and European Championship qualification (based on results across the previous two European qualification cycles), the UEFA Executive Committee decided on 27 September 2007 at its meeting in Istanbul that seeding for the qualifiers would be based on FIFA World Rankings, in accordance with the FIFA World Cup regulations (which note that where teams are ranked on "performance" criteria, the FIFA World Rankings must be used).

The November 2007 FIFA World Ranking the most recent at the time of the preliminary draw and used to determine the groups. Initially scheduled for 21 November, FIFA moved the release date of the ranking to 23 November to include the final match days of Euro 2008 qualification.

Teams in bold eventually qualified for the final tournament, teams in bold italic qualified for the final tournament through the play-offs, and teams in italic participated in the play-offs but did not qualify for the final tournament.

Draw
The draw for the group stage took place in Durban, South Africa on 25 November 2007. During the draw, teams were drawn from the six pots A to F (see above) into the nine groups below, starting with pot F, which filled position 6 in the groups, then continued with pot E filling position 5, pot D in position 4 and so on.

Summary

Table – top row: group winners, second row: group runners-up, third row: others. The winner of each group qualified for the 2010 FIFA World Cup together with winners of play-off. The play-offs took place between the eight best runners-up among all nine groups. The ninth group runner-up did not qualify.

First round

Group 1

Group 2

Group 3

Group 4

Group 5

Group 6

Group 7

Group 8

Group 9

Ranking of second placed teams
Because one group had one team fewer than the others, matches against the sixth placed team in each group were not included in this ranking. As a result, eight matches played by each team counted for the purposes of the second placed table.

Second round

The UEFA second round (often referred to as the play off stage) was contested by the best eight runners up from the nine first round groups. The winners of each of four home and away ties joined the group winners in the World Cup finals in South Africa. Norway, with 10 points, was ranked 9th so failed to qualify for the second round.

Seeding and draw
The eight teams were seeded according to the FIFA World Rankings released on 16 October (shown in parentheses in the table below). The draw for the ties was held in Zürich on 19 October, with the top four teams seeded into one pot and the bottom four teams seeded into a second. A separate draw decided the host of the first leg.

Matches

|}

Qualified teams
The following 13 teams from UEFA qualified for the final tournament.

1 Bold indicates champions for that year. Italic indicates hosts for that year.
2 Competed as West Germany. A separate team for East Germany also participated in qualifications during this time, having only competed in 1974.
3 From 1930 to 1998, Serbia competed together with Bosnia and Herzegovina, Croatia, North Macedonia, Montenegro and Slovenia as part of Yugoslavia, while in 2006 as Serbia and Montenegro together with Montenegro.

Goalscorers
There were 725 goals scored over 268 games by 399 different players, for an average of 2.71 goals per game. England were the highest scorers in the European section with 34 goals. Malta did not score any goals, but did score two own goals. The top scorer was Theofanis Gekas of Greece, who scored ten goals.

Note: Goals scored in the play-offs are included.

10 goals

  Theofanis Gekas

9 goals

  Edin Džeko
  Wayne Rooney

7 goals

  Miroslav Klose
  David Villa

6 goals

  Marc Janko
  Wesley Sonck
  Lukas Podolski
  Robbie Keane
  Elyaniv Barda
  Euzebiusz Smolarek
  Stanislav Šesták
  Andriy Shevchenko

5 goals

  Timofei Kalachev
  Zvjezdan Misimović
  Dimitar Berbatov
  Milan Baroš
  Søren Larsen
  Jonatan Johansson
  Roman Pavlyuchenko
  Milan Jovanović
  Milivoje Novaković
  Alexander Frei
  Blaise Nkufo
  Serhiy Nazarenko

4 goals

  Zlatan Muslimović
  Michalis Konstantinou
  Peter Crouch
  Frank Lampard
  André-Pierre Gignac
  Thierry Henry
  Michael Ballack
  Angelos Charisteas
  Omer Golan
  Alberto Gilardino
  Tomas Danilevičius
  Simão

3 goals

  Erjon Bogdani
  Eduardo
  Luka Modrić
  Ivica Olić
  Ivan Rakitić
  Tomáš Necid
  Nicklas Bendtner
  Jermain Defoe
  Steven Gerrard
  Theo Walcott
  Konstantin Vassiljev
  Nicolas Anelka
  Franck Ribéry
  Levan Kobiashvili
  Bastian Schweinsteiger
  Sándor Torghelle
  Eiður Guðjohnsen
  Yossi Benayoun
  Ben Sahar
  Sergei Khizhnichenko
  Sergei Ostapenko
  Māris Verpakovskis
  Marius Stankevičius
  Mirko Vučinić
  Klaas-Jan Huntelaar
  Dirk Kuyt
  John Arne Riise
  Nani
  Andrey Arshavin
  Konstantin Zyryanov
  Branislav Ivanović
  Nikola Žigić
  Zlatko Dedić
  Juan Mata
  Gerard Piqué
  David Silva
  Olof Mellberg
  Tuncay

2 goals

  Erwin Hoffer
  Vagif Javadov
  Elvin Mammadov
  Gennadi Bliznyuk
  Sergei Kornilenko
  Vitali Rodionov
  Dmitry Verkhovtsov
  Émile Mpenza
  Senijad Ibričić
  Martin Petrov
  Dimitar Telkiyski
  Mladen Petrić
  Efstathios Aloneftis
  Constantinos Charalambidis
  Chrysis Michael
  Václav Svěrkoš
  Christian Poulsen
  Joe Cole
  Sergei Zenjov
  Mikael Forssell
  Karim Benzema
  William Gallas
  Vladimir Dvalishvili
  Dimitris Salpingidis
  Georgios Samaras
  Vasilis Torosidis
  Roland Juhász
  Kevin Doyle
  Richard Dunne
  Glenn Whelan
  Alberto Aquilani
  Daniele De Rossi
  Antonio Di Natale
  Vincenzo Iaquinta
  Vitālijs Astafjevs
  Aleksandrs Cauņa
  Ģirts Karlsons
  Andrejs Rubins
  Mindaugas Kalonas
  Dejan Damjanović
  Stevan Jovetić
  Mark van Bommel
  Rafael van der Vaart
  Warren Feeney
  Kyle Lafferty
  Grant McCann
  Steffen Iversen
  Morten Gamst Pedersen
  Rafał Boguski
  Ireneusz Jeleń
  Mariusz Lewandowski
  Robert Lewandowski
  Marek Saganowski
  Hugo Almeida
  Bruno Alves
  Liédson
  Gheorghe Bucur
  Ciprian Marica
  Diniyar Bilyaletdinov
  Aleksandr Kerzhakov
  James McFadden
  Miloš Krasić
  Nenad Milijaš
  Marek Čech
  Marek Hamšík
  Martin Jakubko
  Ján Kozák
  Valter Birsa
  Robert Koren
  Zlatan Ljubijankić
  Nejc Pečnik
  Cesc Fàbregas
  Álvaro Negredo
  Marcus Berg
  Zlatan Ibrahimović
  Kim Källström
  Philippe Senderos
  Arda Turan
  Emre Belözoğlu
  Semih Şentürk
  Artem Milevskyi
  Yevhen Seleznyov
  Andriy Yarmolenko
  David Edwards

1 goal

  Armend Dallku
  Klodian Duro
  Hamdi Salihi
  Ildefons Lima
  Marc Pujol
  Óscar Sonejee
  Robert Arzumanyan
  Gevorg Ghazaryan
  Hovhannes Goharyan
  Sargis Hovsepyan
  Vahagn Minasyan
  Henrik Mkhitaryan
  René Aufhauser
  Andreas Ivanschitz
  Stefan Maierhofer
  Franz Schiemer
  Martin Stranzl
  Roman Wallner
  Maksim Bardachov
  Alexander Hleb
  Vyacheslav Hleb
  Leonid Kovel
  Pavel Sitko
  Ihar Stasevich
  Steven Defour
  Mousa Dembélé
  Marouane Fellaini
  Gill Swerts
  Daniel Van Buyten
  Zlatan Bajramović
  Vedad Ibišević
  Sanel Jahić
  Sejad Salihović
  Emir Spahić
  Stanislav Angelov
  Valeri Domovchiyski
  Blagoy Georgiev
  Radostin Kishishev
  Dimitar Makriev
  Stiliyan Petrov
  Ivelin Popov
  Ivan Klasnić
  Niko Kovač
  Niko Kranjčar
  Mario Mandžukić
  Ognjen Vukojević
  Demetris Christofi
  Marios Elia
  Konstantinos Makrides
  Ioannis Okkas
  Martin Fenin
  Marek Jankulovski
  Radoslav Kováč
  Jaroslav Plašil
  Zdeněk Pospěch
  Daniel Pudil
  Libor Sionko
  Daniel Agger
  Leon Andreasen
  Daniel Jensen
  Thomas Kahlenberg
  Morten Nordstrand
  Jakob Poulsen
  Gareth Barry
  Rio Ferdinand
  Emile Heskey
  John Terry
  Shaun Wright-Phillips
  Andres Oper
  Raio Piiroja
  Sander Puri
  Vladimir Voskoboinikov
  Egil á Bø
  Arnbjørn Hansen
  Bogi Løkin
  Andreas Lava Olsen
  Súni Olsen
  Shefki Kuqi
  Jari Litmanen
  Niklas Moisander
  Roni Porokara
  Daniel Sjölund
  Hannu Tihinen
  Mika Väyrynen
  Yoann Gourcuff
  Sidney Govou
  Alexander Iashvili
  Levan Kenia
  Thomas Hitzlsperger
  Marcell Jansen
  Simon Rolfes
  Piotr Trochowski
  Heiko Westermann
  Kostas Katsouranis
  Ákos Buzsáky
  Zoltán Gera
  Tamás Hajnal
  Szabolcs Huszti
  Gergely Rudolf
  Veigar Páll Gunnarsson
  Heiðar Helguson
  Indriði Sigurðsson
  Kristján Örn Sigurðsson
  Sean St Ledger
  Aviram Baruchyan
  David Ben Dayan
  Klemi Saban
  Salim Tuama
  Mauro Camoranesi
  Fabio Grosso
  Giampaolo Pazzini
  Andrea Pirlo
  Rinat Abdulin
  Ruslan Baltiev
  Zhambyl Kukeyev
  Tanat Nusserbayev
  Roman Uzdenov
  Kaspars Gorkšs
  Kristaps Grebis
  Deniss Ivanovs
  Vladimirs Koļesņičenko
  Andrejs Perepļotkins
  Aleksejs Višņakovs
  Jurijs Žigajevs
  Mario Frick
  Michele Polverino
  Saulius Mikoliūnas
  Alphonse Leweck
  René Peters
  Jeff Strasser
  Boban Grnčarov
  Filip Ivanovski
  Ilčo Naumoski
  Goran Pandev
  Aco Stojkov
  Serghei Alexeev
  Valeriu Andronic
  Denis Calincov
  Gheorghe Ovseannicov
  Igor Picușceac
  Veaceslav Sofroni
  Radoslav Batak
  Andrija Delibašić
  Eljero Elia
  John Heitinga
  Nigel de Jong
  Joris Mathijsen
  André Ooijer
  Robin van Persie
  Arjen Robben
  Chris Brunt
  Steven Davis
  Jonny Evans
  David Healy
  Gareth McAuley
  Thorstein Helstad
  Erik Huseklepp
  Jakub Błaszczykowski
  Paweł Brożek
  Michał Żewłakow
  Deco
  Edinho
  Raul Meireles
  Pepe
  Miguel Veloso
  Iulian Apostol
  Răzvan Cociș
  Dorin Goian
  Ionuț Mazilu
  Florentin Petre
  Dorel Stoica
  Cristian Tănase
  Vasili Berezutski
  Sergei Ignashevich
  Pavel Pogrebnyak
  Igor Semshov
  Andy Selva
  Kirk Broadfoot
  Scott Brown
  Steven Fletcher
  Ross McCormack
  Zdravko Kuzmanović
  Ivan Obradović
  Marko Pantelić
  Neven Subotić
  Zoran Tošić
  Ľuboš Hanzel
  Filip Hološko
  Erik Jendrišek
  Miroslav Karhan
  Peter Pekarík
  Martin Škrtel
  Miroslav Stoch
  Andraž Kirm
  Aleksandar Radosavljević
  Dalibor Stevanović
  Marko Šuler
  Xabi Alonso
  Joan Capdevila
  Santi Cazorla
  Andrés Iniesta
  Juanito
  Carles Puyol
  Albert Riera
  Marcos Senna
  Samuel Holmén
  Daniel Majstorović
  Anders Svensson
  Eren Derdiyok
  Gélson Fernandes
  Stéphane Grichting
  Benjamin Huggel
  Marco Padalino
  Hakan Yakin
  Halil Altıntop
  Mevlüt Erdinç
  Sercan Yıldırım
  Servet Çetin
  Oleksiy Gai
  Oleh Husyev
  Yaroslav Rakytskiy
  Craig Bellamy
  James Collins
  Joe Ledley
  Aaron Ramsey
  David Vaughan
  Sam Vokes

1 own goal

  Ildefons Lima (playing against Ukraine)
  Jón Rói Jacobsen (playing against Serbia)
  Veli Lampi (playing against Russia)
  Petri Pasanen (playing against Russia)
  Julien Escudé (playing against Romania)
  Avraam Papadopoulos (playing against Luxembourg)
  Kevin Kilbane (playing against Bulgaria)
  Aleksandr Kuchma (playing against England)
  Mario Frick (playing against Wales)
  Ian Azzopardi (playing against Sweden)
  Brian Said (playing against Portugal)
  Seweryn Gancarczyk (playing against Slovakia)
  Michał Żewłakow (playing against Northern Ireland)
  Dorel Stoica (playing against Serbia)
  Ján Ďurica (playing against Northern Ireland)
  Ashley Williams (playing against Germany)

2 own goals

  Kakha Kaladze (playing against Italy)

References

External links
 European Zone at FIFA.com
 UEFA Qualifier results with full game box scores at Scoreshelf.com

 
UEFA
FIFA World Cup qualification (UEFA)
Qual